Nangana is a bounded rural locality  from Melbourne, in Victoria, Australia, located within the Shire of Cardinia local government area. Nangana recorded a population of 54 at the 2021 census.

The town has no post office or official town centre. Like Mount Burnett, Nangana shares its postcode (3781) with Cockatoo.

History

In 1902 Post Offices named Crichton's and Nangana opened in the area. Nangana closed around 1910. Crichton's was renamed Nangana in 1918 and closed in 1964.

References

Towns in Victoria (Australia)
Shire of Cardinia